Georgia Chara (born 30 July 1987) is an Australian television and theatre actress. After starting her acting career in her twenties, she made guest appearances in various television series', including Bed of Roses, Killing Time and Mr & Mrs Murder. In 2013, Chara was cast as Jess Lockwood in Home and Away. She also joined the cast of Wentworth in the starring role of Jess Warner. Chara appeared in the second and third seasons. In 2015, Chara starred as Wednesday in comedy series Sammy J & Randy in Ricketts Lane and made a guest appearance in Neighbours. She also made her stage debut in a production of Exit the King.

Early life
Chara grew up on a farm in Bellbrae. During her teenage years, she moved to Highton and attended Sacred Heart College. For six months she studied finance at Deakin University, before dropping out. She then worked as a personal trainer in Torquay. When she was 20 years old, Chara joined the Screen Actors Studio and she also taught improvisation classes at Mooregrace Acting Studios.

Career
Chara has made guest appearances in Rush, Bed of Roses, Killing Time, and Mr & Mrs Murder. In 2013, Chara was cast in the guest role of Jess Lockwood in Home and Away for six episodes. While she was filming for the Home and Away, Chara successfully auditioned for the recurring role of Jess Warner in the prison drama Wentworth. Chara described her character as "a wrongly accused and scared innocent girl". She made her debut in the second season, which aired in 2014.

Chara also joined the cast of feature film Before Dawn, alongside Samara Weaving and Marcus Graham. In 2015, Chara appeared in the third season of Wentworth and the ABC comedy show Sammy J & Randy in Ricketts Lane. She also joined the cast of Neighbours in the guest role of Indiana Crowe. Chara made her stage debut in a production of Eugène Ionesco's Exit the King at the Geelong Performning Arts Centre. She played the female lead Queen Marguerite.

Filmography

References

External links

Living people
1987 births
Australian film actresses
Australian television actresses
21st-century Australian actresses
Actresses from Victoria (Australia)
Actresses from Geelong
Actors from Geelong